Rodolfo Morandi (30 July 1902 – 26 July 1955) was an Italian socialist politician and economist. He was a member of the Socialist Party and was one of its leading figures following World War II. He served as the minister of industry and commerce in the cabinets led by Prime Minister Alcide De Gasperi in the period 1946–1947.

Biography
Morandi was born in Milan on 30 July 1902. He was arrested in Milan together with other 250 socialists in April 1937.

In July 1946 he was appointed minister of industry and commerce to the cabinet formed by Alcide De Gasperi and remained in the office until May 1947. He served in the Italian Senate from 1948 and served as the general secretary of the Socialist Party. Within the party he was one of the leaders of the leftist faction, the others being Pietro Nenni and Lelio Basso. The leftist faction left the party in 1960 and joined the Communist Party.

Morandi died in Milan on 26 July 1955.

References

External links

1902 births
1955 deaths
Government ministers of Italy
Italian anti-fascists
Italian economists
Italian Socialist Party politicians
Members of the Italian Senate from Lombardy
Politicians from Milan